Leucozonia leucozonalis is a species of sea snail, a marine gastropod mollusk in the family Fasciolariidae, the spindle snails, the tulip snails and their allies.

Description

Distribution
Cuba, Hispaniola, and Grand Cayman Island (Abbott, 1958)

References

 Abbott, R.T. 1958.  The marine mollusks of Grand Cayman Island, British West Indies. Monographs of the Academy of Natural Sciences Philadelphia No. 11.
 Rosenberg, G.; Moretzsohn, F.; García, E. F. (2009). Gastropoda (Mollusca) of the Gulf of Mexico, Pp. 579–699 in: Felder, D.L. and D.K. Camp (eds.), Gulf of Mexico–Origins, Waters, and Biota. Texas A&M Press, College Station, Texas.

External links
  Lamarck, [J.-B. M. de. (1822). Histoire naturelle des animaux sans vertèbres. Tome septième. Paris: published by the Author, 711 pp.]

Fasciolariidae
Gastropods described in 1822